Caloocan National Science and Technology High School (Filipino: Mataas na Paaralang Pang-Agham at Teknolohiyang Pambansa ng Caloocan) colloquially known as CNSTHS or CalNatSci is a special science and technology public high school in the Philippines. It is on Congress Road, Barangay 173, Bagumbong, Caloocan. 
Admission to CNSTHS is by competitive examination.

Caloocan National Science and Technology High School is a project of Caloocan Mayor Oscar OCA Malapitan.

In June 2016, this school has also opened to cater the first batch of Senior High School students under Academic Track - STEM Strand.

History 

Caloocan National Science and Technology High School is along Congress Road and beside University of Caloocan City (North Campus) near Sto. Niño de Congreso Church. The school came into existence through the effort of the benevolence of the mayor, Oscar OCA Malapitan. It is under Republic Act No. 9672 (an Act establishing a National Science and Technology High School in the City of Caloocan to be known as Caloocan National Science and Technology High School) enacted by the Senate and House of Representatives of the Philippines in Congress.

Application and admission 

All applicants must meet the following qualifications:
 Be a grade 6 pupil or grade 10 student.
 Have no grades lower than 85 on all subjects.
 Be of good health condition, of good moral character, and should not have been involved in any violation of school rules and regulations or case of misbehavior in elementary school or junior high school and not a member of any fraternity
 Pass the admission test and the interview.

Selection test 
The examination consists of battery of proficiency tests in Science, Mathematics, English, and Logical Thinking.

Requirements on filing 
 Two pieces of 1x1 identical latest ID pictures with white background.
 Correctly and completely filled Caloocan National Science and Technology High School Forms.
 Authenticated photocopy of School Form 9 (School Report Card 138) as of Third Quarter. No grade lower than 85% in all subjects.
 Recommendation form and authenticated photocopy of NCAE result for incoming Grade 11 applicants only.

The date of submission of files and the date of the Selection Test will be announced on the school's .

Curriculum

References 

Science high schools in Metro Manila
Schools in Caloocan
Educational institutions established in 2012
Public schools in Metro Manila
2012 establishments in the Philippines